Mats Nõges (26 August 1879 in Kärksi, Viljandi Parish – 21 August 1973 in Viljandi) was an Estonian physician, editor and politician. 

From 1915–1922 editor-in-chief of the newspaper Sakala. From 1917 until 1918, he was the Mayor of Viljandi. He was a member of Estonian Constituent Assembly.

References

1879 births
1973 deaths
20th-century Estonian physicians
Estonian editors
Members of the Estonian Constituent Assembly
Mayors of places in Estonia
University of Tartu alumni
People from Viljandi Parish